Kungälv Municipality (Kungälvs kommun) is a municipality in Västra Götaland County in western Sweden. Its seat is located in the city of Kungälv.

The present municipality was formed in 1971 through the amalgamation of the City of Kungälv, the City of Marstrand and territories belonging to four rural municipalities. In 1974 a minor part (situated on the island of Hisingen) was transferred to Gothenburg Municipality.

Kareby IS, which play their home matches at Skarpe Nord in Kungälv, are the reigning bandy champions for women as of 2016. They also won the title in 2011 and 2015.

Geography 
Geographically it borders to Gothenburg Municipality (south), Ale Municipality (east), Lilla Edet Municipality (north-east) and Stenungsund Municipality (north). To the east flows the river Göta älv and to the south, marking the border to Gothenburg, flows the river Nordre älv. On an island in the river, the medieval Bohus Fortress faces the city of Kungälv.

Localities
Marstrand, which was historically a largely autonomous island territory as the Marstrand Free Port. It's the location of the stone fortress Carlsten.
Diseröd
Kareby
Kode
Kungälv
Kärna
Solberga, where the oldest parts of the church dates back to the 12th century
Årsnäs

References

External links

  

Kungälv Municipality
Municipalities of Västra Götaland County
Metropolitan Gothenburg
Gothenburg and Bohus